Water vole may refer to:
In North America, the North American water vole (Microtus richardsoni)
In Eurasia, the three species of the genus Arvicola:
European water vole (Arvicola amphibius; previously Arvicola terrestris)
Southwestern water vole (Arvicola sapidus)
Montane water vole (Arvicola scherman)

Animal common name disambiguation pages